is a feminine Japanese given name. It is rarely used as a surname.

Possible writings
Ayumi can be written using different kanji characters and can mean:
歩み, "course" "walking" "progress"
as a given name
歩, "progress", "walking", "a step"
歩美, "walking, beauty"
歩実, "walking, truth"
鮎己, "sweetfish, oneself"
亜由美, "Asia, reason, beauty"
安愉海, "peaceful, pleasure, sea"
明征魅, "bright, conquer, fascination"
充裕実, "provide, abundant, truth"
歩未, "walking", "not yet"
The given name can also be written in hiragana and katakana.
あゆみ, in hiragana
アユミ, in katakana
あゆ美, mixture of hiragana and kanji
as a surname
漢人
阿弓

People with the name
Ayumi Beppu (別府 あゆみ, born 1983), Japanese actress, tarento, and model
, Japanese artist
Ayumi Fujimura (藤村 歩, born 1982), Japanese voice actress
Ayumi Hamasaki (浜崎 あゆみ, born 1978), Japanese singer
Iconiq (real name Ayumi Itō 伊藤 亜由美, born 1984), Zainichi Korean singer who was a member of the Korean girl group Sugar
Ayumi Ishida (actress) (いしだ あゆみ, born 1948), Japanese actress and singer
Ayumi Ishida (Morning Musume member) (石田 亜佑美, born 1997), Japanese singer who is a member of the J-pop girl group Morning Musume
Ayumi Ito (伊藤 歩, born 1980), Japanese actress
Ayumi Kaihori (海堀あゆみ, born 1986) Japanese association footballer
Ayumi Karino (狩野 亜由美, born 1984), Japanese softball player
Ayumi Kida (喜田あゆ美, born 1966), Japanese actress
Ayumi Kinoshita (木下 あゆ美, born 1982), Japanese actress and model
Ayumi Komura (小村 あゆみ), Japanese manga artist
Ayumi Kurashima (倉島亜由美, born 1977), Japanese freelance animator
Ayumi Kurihara (栗原 亜弓, born 1984), joshi puroresu wrestler
Ayumi Miyazaki (宮崎歩, born 1971), Japanese singer
Ayumi Morita (森田 あゆみ, born 1990), Japanese tennis professional
Ayumi Murata (村田あゆみ, born 1982), Japanese singer
Ayumi Nagashii (永椎 あゆみ, born 1974), alias for the Japanese voice actress Ryoka Yuzuki
, Japanese volleyball player
Ayumi Oka (岡あゆみ, born 1983), Japanese actress
Ayumi Oka (岡あゆみ, born 1986), Japanese tennis player
Okinoumi Ayumi (born 1985), sumo wrestler
Ayumi Onodera (born 1978), Japanese curler
, Japanese ice hockey player
Ayumi Shibata (柴田 あゆみ, born 1984), Japanese singer
Ayumi Shigemori (茂森 あゆみ, born 1971), Japanese actress and pop star
Ayumi Shiina (椎名 あゆみ, born 1969), Japanese shōjo manga artist
Ayumi Tanimoto (谷本 歩実, born 1981), Japanese female judoka
Ayumi Tsuji (辻 あゆみ, born 1984), Japanese voice actress
Ayumi Tsunematsu (恒松 あゆみ, born 1981), Japanese actress
Ayumi Yasutomi, (安冨 歩, born 1963), Japanese economist and politician

Fictional characters
Ayumi Shinozaki, main character in video game Corpse Party.
Ayumi Yoshida, a secondary character from Detective Conan.
The Groovy Girls doll line, by Manhattan Toy, features a doll named Ayumi.
Ayumi Tachibana, main character from video game series Famicom Detective Club.
Ayumi Takahara (高原 歩美), supporting character in the anime Kami Nomi zo Shiru Sekai.
Ayumi Otosaka (乙坂 歩未), main character in the anime Charlotte.
Ayumi Sakagami (坂上 あゆみ), a character from the Pretty Cure All Stars films

Japanese feminine given names